Black River Township is an inactive township in Reynolds County, in the U.S. state of Missouri.

Black River Township was erected in 1845, taking its name from the Black River.

References

Townships in Missouri
Townships in Reynolds County, Missouri